Jeremy Corbyn assumed the position of Leader of the Opposition after being elected as leader of the Labour Party on 12 September 2015; the election was triggered by Ed Miliband's resignation following the Labour Party's electoral defeat at the 2015 general election when David Cameron formed a majority Conservative government. The usual number of junior shadow ministers were also appointed.

Corbyn appointed his first Shadow Cabinet in September 2015. A small reshuffle occurred on 5 January 2016, with one further resignation on 11 January 2016. Dozens of further resignations occurred on 26 and 27 June 2016.

The cabinet was reshuffled following the 2017 and 2019 general elections.

Shadow Cabinet from 2015 to 2020

Junior ministers by department 

Key:

Leader's Office and Cabinet Office

Foreign Relations

Home Affairs

Economy

Social Services

Environment

Housing, Communities and Local Government

Devolved Nations

Parliament

Creation
Corbyn named his first Shadow Cabinet appointments on 13 September and announced its full composition on 14 September. One of Labour's largest reshuffles, the announcement was further delayed by a large number of previous Shadow Cabinet members publicly announcing they would not participate under Corbyn, even if called to do so. The following members declined to serve:

 Chris Leslie was replaced as Shadow Chancellor of the Exchequer by John McDonnell
 Yvette Cooper was replaced as Shadow Home Secretary by Andy Burnham
 Chuka Umunna was replaced as Shadow Secretary of State for Business, Innovation and Skills by Angela Eagle; who was further appointed Shadow First Secretary of State, deputising at Prime Minister's Questions, a role that was filled by Hilary Benn in the previous Shadow Cabinet
 Rachel Reeves was replaced as Shadow Secretary of State for Work and Pensions by Owen Smith, though she was on maternity leave at the time of her announcement and the brief had been filled by Stephen Timms since shortly after the general election, who himself rejected a junior role
 Tristram Hunt was replaced as Shadow Secretary of State for Education by Lucy Powell
 Emma Reynolds was replaced as Shadow Secretary of State for Communities and Local Government by Jon Trickett, who was also appointed to a new role as Shadow Minister for the Constitutional Convention
 Caroline Flint was replaced as Shadow Secretary of State for Energy and Climate Change by Lisa Nandy
 Mary Creagh was replaced as Shadow Secretary of State for International Development by Diane Abbott
 Shabana Mahmood was replaced as Shadow Chief Secretary to the Treasury by Seema Malhotra
 Liz Kendall resigned as Shadow Minister for Care and Older People (attending Shadow Cabinet); a junior minister appointment was not announced immediately. Barbara Keeley was appointed in October 2016.

The remaining changes were as follows:

 Harriet Harman, who had previously announced she would step down from frontbench politics after nearly 30 years, was replaced as Deputy Leader by Tom Watson, who also replaced Powell as Shadow Minister for the Cabinet Office
 Burnham was replaced as Shadow Secretary of State for Health by Heidi Alexander
 Vernon Coaker was replaced as Shadow Secretary of State for Defence by Maria Eagle
 Angela Eagle was replaced as Shadow Leader of the House of Commons by Chris Bryant
 Michael Dugher was replaced as Shadow Secretary of State for Transport by Lilian Greenwood
 Ivan Lewis, who stated he was willing to serve, was replaced as Shadow Secretary of State for Northern Ireland by Coaker
 Owen Smith was replaced as Shadow Secretary of State for Wales by Nia Griffith
 Maria Eagle was replaced as Shadow Secretary of State for Environment, Food and Rural Affairs by Kerry McCarthy
 Bryant was replaced as Shadow Secretary of State for Culture, Media and Sport by Dugher
 Trickett was replaced as Shadow Minister without Portfolio by Jonathan Ashworth, not as a full member, like Trickett, but still attending Shadow Cabinet 
 Gloria De Piero was replaced as Shadow Minister for Women and Equalities by Kate Green, but was appointed to a new role as Shadow Minister for Young People and Voter Registration with full Shadow Cabinet membership
 Luciana Berger was appointed to a new role as Shadow Minister for Mental Health with full Shadow Cabinet membership
 Willy Bach was replaced as Shadow Attorney General (attending Shadow Cabinet) by Catherine McKinnell
 Roberta Blackman-Woods was replaced as Shadow Minister for Housing and Planning by John Healey, though Healey would be attending Shadow Cabinet, unlike Blackman-Woods

Composition
 In his inaugural Shadow Cabinet, 17 out of 31 members were women, making it the first frontbench team in British parliamentary history to comprise a female majority. Corbyn was criticised for giving what are traditionally seen as the top jobs (Chancellor, Home Secretary and Foreign Secretary) to men, although he insisted that positions such as Education and Health Secretary were just as important.
 All members of Corbyn's first Shadow Cabinet previously voted in favour of the Marriage (Same Sex Couples) Act 2013.

January 2016 reshuffle
On 6 January 2016, Corbyn replaced Shadow Culture Secretary Michael Dugher with Shadow Defence Secretary Maria Eagle (who was in turn replaced by Shadow Employment Minister Emily Thornberry). He also replaced Shadow Europe Minister (not attending Shadow Cabinet) Pat McFadden with Pat Glass. The reshuffle prompted three junior shadow ministers to resign in solidarity with McFadden: Shadow Rail Minister Jonathan Reynolds, Shadow Defence Minister Kevan Jones and Shadow Foreign Minister Stephen Doughty. On 7 January, Reynolds was replaced by Andy McDonald, Doughty by Fabian Hamilton, Jones by Kate Hollern and Thornberry by Angela Rayner; as well as appointing Jenny Chapman to the education team and Jo Stevens to the justice team.

On 11 January 2016, Shadow Attorney General Catherine McKinnell resigned, citing party infighting, family reasons and a wish to speak in Parliament away from front-bench responsibilities. She was replaced by Karl Turner.

June 2016 reshuffle

Resignations

On Sunday 26 June and Monday 27 June 2016, a number of members of the shadow cabinet either resigned or were sacked. This process began with Jeremy Corbyn sacking Hilary Benn as Shadow Foreign Secretary in the early hours of Sunday morning after Corbyn informed Benn that he knew Benn had been constructing a coup against the Leadership during the run up to the vote to leave the European Union. Subsequently, the following resigned (in chronological order):
Heidi Alexander – Shadow Health Secretary
Gloria De Piero – Shadow Minister for Young People and Voter Registration
Ian Murray – Shadow Scottish Secretary
Lilian Greenwood – Shadow Transport Secretary
Lucy Powell – Shadow Education Secretary
Kerry McCarthy – Shadow Environment Secretary
Seema Malhotra – Shadow Chief Secretary to the Treasury
Vernon Coaker – Shadow Northern Ireland Secretary
Charles Falconer – Shadow Justice Secretary
Karl Turner – Shadow Attorney General
Chris Bryant – Shadow Leader of the House of Commons
Diana Johnson – Shadow Foreign and Commonwealth Minister
On 27 June:
 Lisa Nandy – Shadow Energy Secretary
 Owen Smith – Shadow Work and Pensions Secretary
 Angela Eagle – Shadow First Secretary of State and Shadow Business Secretary
 John Healey – Shadow Minister for Housing and Planning
 Nia Griffith – Shadow Welsh Secretary
 Maria Eagle – Shadow Culture Secretary
 Kate Green – Shadow Minister for Women and Equalities
 Luciana Berger – Shadow Minister for Mental Health
On 29 June:
 Pat Glass – new Shadow Education Secretary

All cited concerns over the EU vote and Corbyn's leadership.

Lords leader Angela Smith of Basildon and Lords chief whip Steve Bassam stated they would boycott shadow cabinet meetings while Jeremy Corbyn remained leader. They remained members of the shadow cabinet as these positions are elected by the Labour members of the upper chamber. They returned to attending shadow cabinet four months later.

New appointments
Following the resignations, Corbyn appointed several new MPs to shadow cabinet positions:

Emily Thornberry – Shadow Foreign Secretary
Diane Abbott – Shadow Health Secretary
Pat Glass – Shadow Education Secretary (resigned on 29 June 2016)
Andy McDonald – Shadow Transport Secretary
Clive Lewis – Shadow Defence Secretary
Rebecca Long-Bailey – Shadow Chief Secretary to the Treasury
Kate Osamor – Shadow International Development Secretary (resigned on 1 December 2018)
Rachael Maskell – Shadow Environment Secretary
Cat Smith – Shadow Minister for Voter Engagement and Youth Affairs
Dave Anderson – Shadow Northern Ireland Secretary
Dave Anderson – Shadow Scottish Secretary
Richard Burgon – Shadow Justice Secretary
Debbie Abrahams – Shadow Work and Pensions Secretary
Grahame Morris – Shadow Communities Secretary
Barry Gardiner – Shadow Energy Secretary
Jon Trickett – Shadow Lord President of the Council
Jon Trickett – Shadow Business Secretary
Angela Rayner – Shadow Minister for Women and Equalities (later appointed Shadow Education Secretary)
Angela Rayner – Shadow Education Secretary
Paul Flynn – Shadow Secretary of State for Wales
Paul Flynn – Shadow Leader of the House of Commons
Kelvin Hopkins – Shadow Culture Secretary
Emily Thornberry – Shadow Secretary of State for Exiting the European Union
Barry Gardiner – Shadow International Trade Secretary

October 2016 reshuffle
Following his victory in the 2016 Labour Party leadership election, Jeremy Corbyn began a reshuffle of his cabinet on 7 October:

Leader of the Opposition – Jeremy Corbyn
Deputy Leader and Shadow Culture Secretary – Tom Watson
Shadow Chancellor of the Exchequer – John McDonnell
Shadow Foreign Secretary – Emily Thornberry
Shadow Home Secretary – Diane Abbott
Shadow Education Secretary – Angela Rayner
Shadow Work and Pensions Secretary – Debbie Abrahams
Shadow Health Secretary – Jonathan Ashworth
Shadow Defence Secretary – Nia Griffith
Shadow Chief Secretary to the Treasury – Rebecca Long-Bailey
Shadow Secretary of State for Exiting the European Union – Keir Starmer
Shadow Business Secretary – Clive Lewis
Shadow International Trade Secretary – Barry Gardiner
Shadow Transport Secretary – Andy McDonald
Shadow Communities Secretary – Teresa Pearce
Shadow Environment Secretary – Rachael Maskell
Shadow Justice Secretary and Lord Chancellor  – Richard Burgon
Shadow Lord President of the Council – Jon Trickett
Shadow Attorney General – Shami Chakrabarti
Shadow Scotland Secretary and Northern Ireland Secretary – Dave Anderson
Shadow Wales Secretary – Jo Stevens
Shadow Housing Secretary – John Healey
Shadow Women and Equalities Minister – Sarah Champion
Shadow Black and Minority Ethnic Communities Minister – Dawn Butler
Shadow Voter Engagement and Youth Affairs Minister – Cat Smith
Shadow Cabinet Office Minister – Ian Lavery
Shadow Mental Health and Social Care Minister – Barbara Keeley
Shadow Minister without Portfolio – Andrew Gwynne
Shadow Leader of the House of Commons – Valerie Vaz

Summary of changes
Owen Smith, who lost to Corbyn in the preceding leadership election, declined to continue in Shadow Cabinet, if offered. Angela Smith and Steve Bassam formally returned to Shadow Cabinet as Shadow Leader of the House of Lords and Shadow Chief Whip of the House of Lords after boycotting following the June reshuffle.

Tom Watson, the Deputy Leader of the Opposition, was moved from Shadow Minister for the Cabinet Office and replaced by Ian Lavery.
Andy Burnham resigned as Shadow Home Secretary to focus on his 2017 bid for Mayor of Greater Manchester and was replaced by Diane Abbott. This made the first Labour frontbench where two of the Great Offices of State were held by women.
Clive Lewis was moved from Shadow Secretary of State for Defence and was replaced by Nia Griffith.
Lewis was given the newly merged Shadow Secretary of State for Business, Energy and Industrial Strategy to reflect the departmental changes at Whitehall. Jon Trickett, who had been Shadow Secretary of State for Business, Innovation and Skills, remained Shadow Lord President of the Council and Director of Campaigns and Elections. Barry Gardiner, who had been Shadow Secretary of State for Energy and Climate Change, remained Shadow Secretary of State for International Trade.
Emily Thornberry remained Shadow Foreign Secretary, but was replaced as Shadow Secretary of State for Exiting the European Union by Keir Starmer.
Abbott was replaced as Shadow Secretary of State for Health by Jon Ashworth.
Grahame Morris went on leave and was replaced as Shadow Secretary of State for Communities and Local Government and Shadow Minister for the Constitutional Convention by Teresa Pearce.
Kelvin Hopkins was replaced as Shadow Secretary of State for Culture, Media and Sport by Watson.
John Healey, who had resigned as Shadow Secretary of State for Housing in the previous June reshuffle, returned and was promoted to Shadow Secretary of State for Housing.
Paul Flynn retired from Shadow Cabinet and was replaced as Shadow Leader of the House of Commons by Valerie Vaz, and as Shadow Secretary of State for Wales by Jo Stevens.
Shami Chakrabarti was ennobled and appointed as Shadow Attorney General, which had been vacant since Karl Turner's resignation in June.
Rosie Winterton was replaced as Shadow Chief Whip of the House of Commons by Nick Brown.
Barbara Keeley was appointed Shadow Minister for Mental Health, which had been vacant since Luciana Berger's resignation in June.
Dawn Butler was appointed to a new post as Shadow Minister for Black and Minority Ethnic Communities.
Ashworth was replaced as Shadow Minister without Portfolio by Andrew Gwynne.

February 2017 reshuffle

Resignations
On Thursday 19 January, Jeremy Corbyn was reported to be preparing to order Labour MPs to vote to support triggering Article 50 in the vote on the European Union (Notification of Withdrawal) Bill 2017, in line with a three-line whip. This triggered the following resignations from the frontbench (in chronological order):

On Thursday 26 January:
 Tulip Siddiq – Shadow Minister for Early Years (not in Shadow Cabinet)

On Friday 27 January: 
 Jo Stevens – Shadow Welsh Secretary

On Wednesday 1 February: 
 Dawn Butler – Shadow Minister for Diverse Communities
 Rachael Maskell – Shadow Secretary of State for Environment, Food and Rural Affairs

On Wednesday 8 February:
 Clive Lewis – Shadow Secretary of State for Business, Energy and Industrial Strategy

Replacements

 Clive Lewis was replaced by Rebecca Long-Bailey as Shadow Business Secretary
 Rebecca Long-Bailey was replaced by Peter Dowd as Shadow Chief Secretary to the Treasury
 Rachael Maskell was replaced by Sue Hayman as Shadow Environment Secretary
 Jo Stevens was replaced by Christina Rees as Shadow Welsh Secretary

June 2017 reshuffles
Following the 2017 general election, Corbyn began a reshuffle of his shadow cabinet:

On 14 June 2017:
 Emily Thornberry was appointed Shadow First Secretary of State;
 Owen Smith was appointed Shadow Secretary of State for Northern Ireland;
 Andrew Gwynne was appointed Shadow Secretary of State for Communities and Local Government;
 Dawn Butler was appointed Shadow Minister for Diverse Communities;
 Lesley Laird was appointed Shadow Secretary of State for Scotland.

Later that month, Corbyn sacked three shadow ministers (Ruth Cadbury, Catherine West and Andy Slaughter) and a fourth (Daniel Zeichner) resigned. This was after they had rebelled against party orders to abstain in the vote on a motion that was proposed by the then Labour MP Chuka Umunna and was aimed at keeping the UK in the EU single market.

August 2017
Dawn Butler was appointed Shadow Secretary of State for Women and Equalities, replacing Sarah Champion.

October 2017
Richard Corbett was elected Leader of the European Parliamentary Labour Party, replacing Glenis Willmott and attending Shadow Cabinet meetings.

January 2018
Tommy McAvoy was elected Opposition Chief Whip in the House of Lords, replacing Steve Bassam.

March 2018
Debbie Abrahams, Shadow Secretary of State for Work and Pensions, was sacked. She was replaced by Margaret Greenwood. Owen Smith, Shadow Secretary of State for Northern Ireland, was sacked. He was replaced by Tony Lloyd.

December 2018
Kate Osamor, Shadow Secretary of State for International Development, resigned. She was replaced by Dan Carden.

January 2020

2020 post-election cabinet reshuffle 
In the 2019 general election, a number of Shadow Ministers lost their seats; mostly to Boris Johnson's Conservatives. The following replacement appointments were made.

 Sue Hayman was replaced as Shadow Secretary of State for Environment, Food and Rural Affairs by Luke Pollard.
 Laura Pidcock was replaced as Shadow Secretary of State for Employment Rights by Rachael Maskell.
 Lesley Laird was replaced as Shadow Secretary of State for Scotland by Tony Lloyd.
 Liz McInnes was replaced as Shadow Foreign Office Minister for South Asia, Sub-Saharan Africa and the Commonwealth by Afzal Khan.
 Jenny Chapman was replaced as Shadow Brexit Minister by Thangam Debbonaire.
 Jo Platt was replaced as Shadow Minister of State for the Cabinet Office by Cat Smith.

As Tom Watson stood down at the election, he was replaced as Shadow Secretary of State for Digital, Culture, Media and Sport by Tracy Brabin.

Newcomer MP Bell Ribeiro-Addy was immediately appointed Shadow Minister for Immigration.

Positions without successors 

 Karen Lee was not replaced as Shadow Fire and Rescue Services Minister.
 David Drew was not replaced as Shadow Farming and Rural Communities Minister
 Sandy Martin was not replaced as Shadow Minister for Waste and Recycling.
 Danielle Rowley was not replaced as Shadow Minister for Climate Justice and Green Jobs.
 Paula Sherriff was not replaced as Shadow Minister for Social Care and Mental Health.
 Paul Sweeney was not replaced as Shadow Scotland Minister.

See also
 Shadow Cabinet of Keir Starmer
 Official Opposition (United Kingdom)
 Official Opposition frontbench
 Cabinet of the United Kingdom
 British Government frontbench
 Liberal Democrat Frontbench Team
 Frontbench Team of Ian Blackford

References

Jeremy Corbyn
Corbyn
Official Opposition (United Kingdom)
2015 establishments in the United Kingdom
British shadow cabinets
2015 in British politics
2020 disestablishments in the United Kingdom